Jan Blažek (13 September 1947 – 29 September 2016) was a Czech basketball player. He competed in the men's tournament at the 1972 Summer Olympics.

See also
Czechoslovak Basketball League career stats leaders

References

1947 births
2016 deaths
Czech men's basketball players
Olympic basketball players of Czechoslovakia
Basketball players at the 1972 Summer Olympics
Place of birth missing